Router table may refer to
 Routing table - a concept in computer networking
 Router table (woodworking) - a power tool used in woodworking